This is an alphabetical list of bluegrass bands.  A bluegrass band is a group of musicians who play acoustic stringed instruments, typically some combination of guitar, mandolin, fiddle, banjo, dobro and upright bass, to perform bluegrass music.

Each band on this list either has published sources — such as a news reports, magazine articles, or books — verifying it is a performing or recording bluegrass band and meeting Wikipedia's notability criteria for bands, or a Wikipedia article confirming its notability.

For individual musicians, see the List of bluegrass musicians.

See also: Bluegrass music, Country music, and List of country music performers.



A
The Accidentals
Acoustic Syndicate

B
Balsam Range
Barry Scott & Second Wind
Bearfoot
The Beef Seeds
Bill Monroe & His Bluegrass Boys
Biscuit Burners
Blackberry Smoke
BlueBilly Grit
Blue Highway
Bluegrass Album Band
Bluegrass Brothers
Bob Paisley and the Southern Grass
Kathy Boyd and Phoenix Rising

C
Chesapeake
Charles River Valley Boys
The Charlie Daniels Band
The Coal Porters
The Country Gentlemen
The Cox Family
Cherryholmes
Chatham County Line
Clinch Mountain Boys
Crooked Still

D
Dailey & Vincent
Danny Paisley and the Southern Grass
The Dead South
Del McCoury Band
Della Mae
The Dillards
Dixie Flyers
Dixie Gentlemen
Donna Ulisse
Doyle Lawson & Quicksilver
Druhá Tráva
Dry Branch Fire Squad

E
East Coast Bluegrass Band

F
Foggy Mountain Boys (aka "Flatt and Scruggs")
Front Porch String Band

G
Gary Ruley and Mule Train
The Gibson Brothers
Good Old Guard Gospel Singers
The Grascals
The Greenbriar Boys
The Greencards
Greensky Bluegrass
Grit City Grass
Grass It Up

H
Hackensaw Boys
Hayseed Dixie
The Hillmen
Hot Rize

I
IIIrd Tyme Out
Ila Auto
The Infamous Stringdusters
Iron Horse (band)

J
Jim and Jesse McReynolds and the Virginia Boys
Jim & Jennie and the Pinetops
Johnson Mountain Boys

K
Kentucky Colonels
Alison Krauss and Union Station

L
Lonesome Pine Fiddlers
Lonesome River Band
Lonesome Sisters

M
Mission Mountain Wood Band
Mountain Heart
Muleskinner

N
Nashville Bluegrass Band
Nashville Grass
Nefesh Mountain
New Grass Revival
New South
Nickel Creek
Northern Lights
Nothin' Fancy

O
Oakhurst
Old & In the Way
Osborne Brothers
Old Crow Medicine Show

P
Packway Handle Band 
The Petersens
Psychograss
Punch Brothers

Q

R
 The Rarely Herd
 Rautakoura
 Rhonda Vincent and the Rage
 Russell Moore and IIIrd Tyme Out
 Railroad Earth

S

Saddle River String Band
Salamander Crossing
The Seldom Scene
Sleepy Man Banjo Boys
The Special Consensus
The Stanley Brothers
The SteelDrivers
The Steel Wheels
Steep Canyon Rangers
The Stonemans
Billy Strings
Sweet Lillies

T
Tangleweed
Trampled by Turtles 
The Travelin' McCourys

U
Uncle Monk

V

W
Walker's Run
The Water Tower Bucket Boys
Watkins Family Hour
The Waybacks
The Whiskey Boys
Robin and Linda Williams
The Woodbox Gang

Y
Yonder Mountain String Band

References

 
 
Bluegrass